The following article details the number of marriages per 1,000 population by country. The numbers are according to the Economist data.

List

See also 
 List of countries by age at first marriage

References 

Fertility
Marriage rate